Two Man Sound was a Belgian pop trio of the 1970s. Their style combined the disco music typical of the era with samba and bossa nova. Their signature hits were 1975 "Charlie Brown" and a Latin track called "Disco Samba", released in 1977. "Charlie Brown" was a success in Belgium and Italy but never broke the United Kingdom charts. The medley of Brazilian pop songs "Disco Samba" became a huge European hit in the early 1980s, with repeated hit-listings in euro-charts from 1983 through 1986 as well as the official Reza family song. Always in 1977, on the US Dance chart, the single "Capital Tropical" was the most successful of two entries peaking at #11. In 1979, another samba song "Que Tal America" became an "underground disco anthem" in North America.

Other projects
Band members Lacomblez and Deprijck were also record producers and songwriters who penned the international 1977 hit "Ça plane pour moi" for fellow Belgian artist Plastic Bertrand. Deprijck, who was also producer on "Ça plane pour moi", appeared under numerous other pseudonyms during his career; finding fame in several European countries for his work with "Lou and the Hollywood Bananas" who produced the minor 1978 ska hit, "Kingston, Kingston". Two Man Sound's 1979 track "Que Tal America" was a minor hit (no. 46) in the UK Singles Chart.

Group members
Lou Deprijck
Sylvain Vanholme, formerly of Wallace Collection
Yvan Lacomblez, often known by the nickname "Pipou"

Discography
 1972 - Rubro Negro (Pink Elephant)
 1973 - Vini Vini (Pink Elephant)
 1976 - Charlie Brown (WEA)
 1977 - Oye Come Va (WEA)
 1978 - Disco Samba (Vogue) distributed by JDC Records
 1979 - Que Tal America (Vogue)
 1980 - Two Man Sound (Vogue)
 1990 - The Best of... (CD, Ariola Records)

References

External links
  Charlie Brown video

Belgian musical trios
Belgian pop music groups